The Etimesgut High-speed rail maintenance facility, officially known as the Main High-speed rail Maintenance Facility, is a passenger rail yard used exclusively for YHT high-speed train-sets in Ankara, Turkey.

The yard contains a large high-speed rail maintenance shop together with a high-speed rail focused training facility for employees. A wide turning loop, facing east, spans the perimeter of the facility. Ankara West YHT station is under construction, just south of the facility, and will become a main railway station in west Ankara; it is scheduled to open by December 2017.

Entrance to the facility is via the D.140, from the north.

Construction of the facility began in late 2013, on land bought from the Etimesgut Sugar Factory, and completed in February 2016. It is owned by the Turkish State Railways.

References

See also
Ankara Tren Garı
Ankara West YHT station

Rail yards in Turkey
2016 establishments in Turkey